Selen Özbilen (born 22 March 2001) is a Turkish swimmer. She represented Turkey at the 2019 World Aquatics Championships held in Gwangju, South Korea. She competed in the women's 50 metre freestyle and women's 100 metre freestyle events. In both events she did not advance to compete in the semi-finals. She also competed in two women's relay events and two mixed relay events, without winning a medal.

References

External links

2001 births
Living people
Turkish female swimmers
Place of birth missing (living people)
Swimmers at the 2018 Mediterranean Games
Turkish female freestyle swimmers
Mediterranean Games competitors for Turkey
Northwestern Wildcats women's swimmers
Islamic Solidarity Games medalists in swimming
21st-century Turkish sportswomen